Hopwood may refer to:

People
Hopwood (surname)

Places
 Australia
Hopwood Beach, Tasmania

 United Kingdom
Hopwood Hall, near Manchester
Hopwood, Greater Manchester
Hopwood, Worcestershire

 United States
Hopwood, Pennsylvania

Other uses
Hopwood v. Texas, an American court case in 1996 concerning affirmative action
Hopwood Award, a literary scholarship awarded by the University of Michigan